Jardin Exotique is the westernmost ward in the Principality of Monaco. It is incorporated in the traditional quarter of La Condamine.

History 
Jardin Exotique was formed in 2013 from the merger of the residential areas of La Colle and Les Révoires. An underground and pedestrian axis is scheduled to be completed in 2023 and it will link the top of Boulevard du Jardin Exotique to Fontvieille.

Geography 
Jardin Exotique lies on the northwestern side of the principality. La Colle and Les Révoires are generally considered part of Moneghetti, even though they were their own administrative wards. Jardin Exotique runs directly along the neighbouring French towns of Beausoleil and Cap-d'Ail, as well as the Monégasque ward Moneghetti. The newly created ward covers an area of 0.23 square kilometers (23.49 hectares).

The Les Révoires area, which has steep inclines, offers views of the Rock of Monaco and the Mediterranean. It is also the location of the Chemin des Révoires, Monaco's highest point, 162 m above sea level.

Landmarks
Jardin Exotique contains the celebrated Jardin Exotique de Monaco (French: for Exotic Garden of Monaco) in which the ward is named after. Founded by Prince Albert I in 1933, the garden contains a rich collection of over a thousand succulent and cacti. There is also a museum, called the Prehistoric Anthropology, located within the Exotic Garden, which displays a variety of prehistoric remains.

Through La Colle, Princess Grace Hospital Centre, Monaco's only public hospital, is located in the westernmost portion of Jardin Exotique.

See also
 Municipality of Monaco
 Geography of Monaco

References

External links 

Quarters of Monaco